Toviklin  is a town, arrondissement, and commune in the Kouffo Department of south-western Benin. The commune covers an area of 120 square kilometres and as of 2013 had a population of 88,611 people.

References
 

Communes of Benin
Arrondissements of Benin
Populated places in the Kouffo Department